Killannin is a Gaelic Athletic Association club based in County Galway, Ireland. The club is a member of the Galway GAA. The club is one of 18 teams competing in the Senior Championship in Galway. Their best result in the competition came in 2000, where they reached the final, losing out narrowly to Corofin.

History
Kevin Walsh and Gary Fahey were both involved in Galway's 1998 and 2001 All-Ireland Senior Football Championship (SFC) title wins. Walsh won an All Star Award in 2003 and later managed Sligo and Galway. Walsh's first involvement with Galway was winning an All-Ireland Minor Football Championship medal in 1986. Fahey captained Galway to the 2001 All-Ireland SFC win.

Johnny Heaney was part of the team that qualified for the 2022 All-Ireland Senior Football Championship Final.

Current squad
Shane Sheridan;
PJ Gorham,
David Walsh,
Edwin Murray;
Johnny Heaney,
Peter O'Halloran, 
Ronan Caldwell;
Burke the Shmirk,
James Walsh,
Eamonn McDonagh;
Marvin Lee,
Cathal Sweeney,
Ruairí Greene;
LUKER,
Stephen Kavanagh,
Patrick Sweeney,
Niall Walsh;
Kieran Caldwell,

Niall Acton,
The Trunk,
Ferdia O'Halloran,
Kevin Walsh,
Darragh Kinnevey,
Enda Kelly,
Bungalow,
David O'Connor,
Ian Thornton,
Christy Lydon,
Robert Lee,
Enda Fahey,

Cathal Walsh,
Robert Ryan,
Gary Heffernan,
Paul (Gizzy) Fahey,
The Drake,
The Veteran Finbar Thomas,

Honours
 Galway Intermediate Football Championship (2): 1991, 2014
 Galway Under-21 A Football Championship (2): 1996, 2001

Gaelic football clubs in County Galway
Gaelic games clubs in County Galway